Club Cultural y Deportivo Alberite is a Spanish football team based in Alberite in the autonomous community of La Rioja. Founded in 1967, it plays in Tercera División Group 16. Its stadium is Estadio Marino Sáenz with a capacity of 2,000 seaters.

Season to season

12 seasons in Tercera División

References

External links
Futbolme.com profile
frfutbol.com profile

Football clubs in La Rioja (Spain)
Association football clubs established in 1967
Divisiones Regionales de Fútbol clubs
1967 establishments in Spain